Martin Tišťan (born 12 November 1992) is a male Slovak racewalker. He competed in the 50 kilometres walk event at the 2015 World Championships in Athletics in Beijing, China.

See also
 Slovakia at the 2015 World Championships in Athletics

References

External links 
 
 Martin Tišťan at the Slovenský Olympijský Výbor 
 

Place of birth missing (living people)
1992 births
Living people
Slovak male racewalkers
World Athletics Championships athletes for Slovakia
Athletes (track and field) at the 2016 Summer Olympics
Olympic athletes of Slovakia
Sportspeople from Banská Bystrica